WMFU (90.1 FM) is a radio station broadcasting a Variety format, licensed to Mount Hope, New York, United States.  The station is owned by Auricle Communications.

Since 1996, WMFU is a repeater station of WFMU, a radio station that is based in Jersey City, New Jersey, after Auricle (the owners of WFMU) received the station as a donation.

History
The station went on the air as WEXX on April 3, 1990. On July 9, 1990, the station changed its call sign to WDHZ, again on September 3, 1990, to WXHD, and on May 10, 2009, to the current WMFU.

See also

 WFMU/91.1 FM, licensed to East Orange, New Jersey
 List of WFMU Radio Hosts
 List of community radio stations in the United States

References

External links

 
 

MFU